The 1972 Clemson Tigers football team was an American football team that represented Clemson University in the Atlantic Coast Conference (ACC) during the 1972 NCAA University Division football season. In its third and final season under head coach Hootie Ingram, the team compiled a 4–7 record (2–5 against conference opponents), finished fifth in the ACC, and was outscored by a total of 245 to 143. The team played its home games at Memorial Stadium in Clemson, South Carolina.

Head coach Hootie Ingram resigned shortly after the conclusion of the season.

Wade Hughes, Buddy King, and Frank Wirth were the team captains. The team's statistical leaders included quarterback Ken Pengitore with 831 passing yards, running back Wade Hughes with 761 rushing yards, Dennis Goss with 385 receiving yards, and Heide Davis and Wade Hughes with 30 points scored (5 touchdowns each).

No Clemson players were selected by the United Press International as first-team players on the 1972 All-Atlantic Coast Conference football team.

Schedule

References

Clemson
Clemson Tigers football seasons
Clemson Tigers football